Roosevelt is an "L" station on the CTA's Red, Green, and Orange Lines, located between the Chicago Loop and the Near South Side in Chicago, Illinois. It is situated at 1167 S State Street, just north of Roosevelt Road.

History and description

Elevated station

An elevated station at Roosevelt opened on June 6, 1892, as part of the Chicago and South Side Rapid Transit Railroad, the first elevated rapid transit line in Chicago. From 1919 to 1963, interurban trains of the North Shore Line also used the station. "L" service through the station was discontinued in 1949 when CTA routed all trains from the Englewood and Jackson Park branches through the State Street subway, using the 13th Street portal, forming the North-South Route (a precursor of today's Red Line), and following the bankruptcy of the North Shore Line in 1963 the station was closed completely and demolished. "L" service resumed passing the site of the original station in 1969 when the CTA began to route Dan Ryan trains into the Loop and a new elevated station was constructed in 1993 as part of the construction of the Orange Line.

Immediately south of the station exists a pocket track, which is used to turn trains back to the Loop if any activity, such as construction, is obstructing rail traffic.

Subway station
The subway station at Roosevelt opened on October 17, 1943, as part of the State Street subway. In 1993, when the new elevated station was constructed it was intended that there should be a direct link to the subway, however, due to lack of money this was not initially built. In 2002, the stations were finally linked as a single facility through the Roosevelt transfer tunnel.

Operations as a terminus

The subway station and elevated station have been used as termini, albeit both on very rare occasions. The subway station last functioned as a terminus during Ravenswood Connector construction, when Brown Line trains were rerouted via the State Street subway to Roosevelt.

Bus connections
CTA 
 12 Roosevelt
 18 16th/18th
 29 State
 62 Archer (Owl Service)
 130 Museum Campus (Memorial Day through Labor Day only)
 146 Inner Lake Shore/Michigan Express
 192 University of Chicago Hospitals Express (Weekday Rush Hours only)

Notes and references

Notes

References

External links 

Roosevelt Station on the CTA website
Roosevelt/State station page at Chicago-L.org
Roosevelt/Wabash station page at Chicago-L.org

CTA Red Line stations
CTA Green Line stations
CTA Orange Line stations
Railway stations in the United States opened in 1943
Railway stations in the United States opened in 1892
Former North Shore Line stations